Seychellia lodoiceae is a species of spider in the family Telemidae. The species is endemic to Vallée de Mai Nature Reserve on Praslin Island in the Seychelles.

References

Endemic fauna of Seychelles
Spiders of Africa
Telemidae
Spiders described in 1980